Iranian Rail Industries Development Co (IRICO) (Iriku) is an Iranian manufacturer of passenger rolling stock. The company was founded in 2003 and began series production of rail vehicles in 2009. The company has several license manufactured rolling stock in cooperation such as Hyundai Rotem, Siemens, Stadler & CRRC Puzhen.

History
Iranian Rail Industries Development Co (IRICO) was founded in with the aim of domestic manufacture of rolling stock including metro, suburban, light rail and monorail vehicles. A $45 million investment established a factory in Abhar, Zanjan province Iran.

IRICO designs & manufactures various types of rolling stocks such as passenger coaches, metro cars, Diesel Multiple Units (RailBus DMU), various freight wagons and bogies in accordance with UIC standards. Moreover, IRICO rolling stock design & engineering team, expertise and experience of engineers, production team and its domestic and international supply chain give it the capability to provide high performance refurbishment, overhaul and upgrading/renovation services for passenger coaches and locomotives either at IRICO facilities or at client remises.

Production at the plant began in February 2009 after a formal inauguration in December 2008; at inception the plant had a capacity of 100 vehicles p.a. with single shift working.

In 2004 Rotem entered into a technology transfer and manufacturing agreement (value €110 million) with IRICO for the supply of passenger trainsets; 24 units were to manufactured by Rotem in 2006, 24 assembled from CKD kits by IRICO, and the remainder manufactured by IRICO with Rotem assistance. The trains were manufactured for the Raja Passenger Train Company.

In 2010 IRICO won a contract to supply 135 vehicles for the Shiraz Metro.

In March 2016 IRICO was acquired by IGG Group.

The DMU contract was extended in December 2017 to another contract for supplying 450 DMU cars for increasing passenger transportation capacity of Iran. The first 150 vehicles will be built at Hyundai Rotem’s plant in Changwon, Korea. The remaining 300 vehicles will be assembled locally by Iranian Rail Industries Development (IRICO). All 450 cars will be delivered within 78 months of contract signing. has been awarded a $US 856 million contract by Iranian Islamic Republic Railways (RAI ) to supply 150 three-car DMUs.

See also
 Iranian railway industry

References

External links
 , Official site (archived)

Rolling stock manufacturers of Iran
Manufacturing companies based in Tehran
Iranian entities subject to the U.S. Department of the Treasury sanctions